Anders Carlsson (born 24 January 1951) is a Swedish politician and former chairman of the Communist Party from 1999 until 2014.
Carlsson's mother was one of Sweden's first kindergarten teachers and his father was a sailor and later on a sea captain.

In 1969 he was elected member of KFML and in 1972 he was employed by the newspaper Proletären. He has been working for the party ever since.

He got his first file in the Swedish Security Service's archive in 1968, after participating in a study circle on Marxism.

References 

Leaders of political parties in Sweden
Swedish communists
Living people
1951 births
20th-century Swedish people
21st-century Swedish people